Macrozamia moorei is a cycad in the family Zamiaceae, native to Queensland (Australia).

The species was described by Ferdinand von Mueller in 1881, naming it after Charles Moore (1820–1905), director of the Royal Botanic Gardens, Sydney.

Description

Cultivation
The plant is cultivated by specialty plant nurseries as an ornamental plant.

Gallery

References

 Jones, David L. Cycads of the world. Australia, Reed Books (1993).
 Harden, Gwen J.  Flora of New South Wales. Kensington, NSW (Australia), New South Wales University Press (1990).

External links
 The Cycad Pages: Macrozamia moorei
 Macrozamia moorei F.Muell.
 PACSOA: Macrozamia moorei

moorei
Flora of Queensland
Cycadophyta of Australia
Endemic flora of Australia
Least concern flora of Australia
Least concern biota of Queensland
Garden plants of Australia
Plants described in 1881
Taxa named by Ferdinand von Mueller